Aditya Bhushan Pant is an Indian toxicologist, neurobiologist and a scientist at the Indian Institute of Toxicology Research. He is known for his studies in the fields of developmental toxicology, in vitro experiments as well as pesticides and is a member of the Neurobiology Task force of the Department of Biotechnology. His studies have been documented by way of a number of articles and ResearchGate, an online repository of scientific articles has listed 121 of them. Besides, he has contributed chapters to books published by others and is an associate editor of the Annals of Neurosciences journal of the Indian Academy of Neurosciences. He is a recipient for the  Shakuntala Amir Chand Prize of the Indian Council of Medical Research in 2007. The Department of Biotechnology of the Government of India awarded him the National Bioscience Award for Career Development, one of the highest Indian science awards, for his contributions to biosciences, in 2012.

Selected bibliography

Chapters

Articles

See also 

 Apoptosis
 Omentum

Notes

References

External links 
 

N-BIOS Prize recipients
Indian scientific authors
Living people
Indian medical researchers
Indian toxicologists
Indian neuroscientists
Scientists from Lucknow
1968 births